Carol Johnston (March 10, 1958 - May 11, 2019) was a Canadian competitive gymnast, born without a right arm below her elbow. Despite her disability, Johnston became a collegiate gymnastics champion, and was featured in Disney's 1980 TV film "Lefty".

Early life
Carol Johnston was born on March 10, 1958, in Calgary, Alberta. At first she planned on going into figure skating. The only reason that she started gymnastics was to strengthen her legs for figure skating. She got really into gymnastics and fell in love with it. So at the age of 12, she put her mind and soul into gymnastics, training at the Altadore Gymnastics Club in Calgary. During a visit to Canada in 1976, gymnastics coach Lynn Rogers was introduced to Johnston and reportedly was "blown away" when he first saw her, offering her a spot to join the gymnastics squad  at California State University, Fullerton, which she did.

Competitions
In 1975, Johnston performed in the Canada Winter Games and the following year she competed at the  Junior Olympics in Montreal and at the Hawaii Invitationals. After that, she competed four seasons with the Titans at Cal State Fullerton from 1977 to 1980. As a Fullerton Titan, she became Western Collegiate Athletic Association conference champion on the balance beam in 1977, runner-up in the NCAA meet at Seattle, in both beam and floor, in 1978, and was two-time-All-American as awarded by the Association for Intercollegiate Athletics for Women on balance beam and floor exercise. Also in the first three seasons in which she competed for the Titans, the Cal State Fullerton gymnastics squad compiled a record of 45–0 in meets. In 1979, she was determined to win the gold at the NCAA championships, training her hardest that season. Unfortunately, she tore her anterior cruciate ligament during a fall from uneven bars in the warm-up for a competition against UCLA, was unable to finish the meet, had her leg in a cast for eight weeks and was sidelined for the season. It was when she got this injury that she said she truly felt disabled. After her injury, she made a comeback for the 1980 season, but re-injured her knee again, underwent major knee reconstruction surgery and had no other choice but to stop competitive gymnastics.

Life after retirement from competitive gymnastics
Johnston graduated from California State University, Fullerton in 1981 and in 1988 graduated with a Masters in physical education with a specialization in sports psychology from Cal State. She settled in California, worked in human resources and personnel management, taught gymnastics part-time, and did some public speaking.
 
In 1992, Johnston was given the Outstanding Achievement Award by the Orange County Committee for Employment of Persons with Disabilities.

In October 2013, she was inducted into Cal State Fullerton Athletics Hall of Fame, where it was revealed that she now faced a new challenge having been diagnosed with Alzheimer's disease in 2012, but with the support of her husband, Scott D. Koniar, and friends tried to have a life as normal as possible.

Inspiration
In 1979, a documentary short on Johnston was made by Disney, entitled The Truly Exceptional: Carol Johnston that was shown in schools; this was one in the series of The Truly Exceptional by Walt Disney Educational short films, aiming to show how people live with disabilities. That short was later made into an expanded version that first aired on 21st Sept. 1980 on NBC's Disney's Wonderful World, as the TV movie "Lefty".

In 1982, she was the subject of a book by Pete Donovan titled Carol Johnston: One-Armed Gymnast.

Johnston said that she was born with drive due to her disability, and never felt sorry for herself (being more concerned about being short at 4-foot-10). Many people have been inspired by her story and positive attitude, such as other gymnasts with similar disabilities, as well as others who realize that their own struggles are not nothing compared to living with a disability like hers. She died on May 11, 2019, due to complications from Early On-set Alzheimers.

References

External links
 Carol Johnston's Official Titans Class of 2013 Hall of Fame Photo Gallery 
 Congratulations slideshow for Carol Johnston's Cal State Fullerton's Hall of Fame induction

1958 births
2019 deaths
Canadian female artistic gymnasts
Sportspeople from Calgary
Neurological disease deaths in Alberta
Deaths from Alzheimer's disease
20th-century Canadian women
21st-century Canadian women